Ngkolmpu Kanum, or Ngkontar, is part of a dialect chain in the Yam family spoken by the Kanum people of New Guinea. The Ngkâlmpw (Ngkontar) and moribund Bädi varieties have limited mutual intelligibility may be considered distinct languages.

Dialects 
Languages spoken by the Kanum have variously been referred to as Ngkâlmpw Kanum, Enkelembu, Kenume, and Knwne. Carroll describes three varieties forming a dialect chain. Ngkolmpu is divided into Ngkontar and the moribund variety Baedi (Bädi).

Phonology

Consonants 
Ngkolmpu Kanum has 15 consonant phonemes (plus two marginal phonemes) at three points of articulation: bilabial, coronal, and velar. Prenasalized voiceless stops and fricatives contrast with voiceless and nasal realizations, which is typologically unusual. The orthography is enclosed in angle brackets.

Grammar 
The Ngkolmpu (Ngkâlmpw) Kanum variety is notable for its complex verbal inflection and tendency to distribute grammatical features throughout an utterance, referred to as distributed exponence.

External links 

 ELAR collection: The Endangered Papuan Languages of Merauke-Indonesia: ethnobiological and linguistic documentation deposited by I Wayan Arka

References

Western Yam languages
Languages of western New Guinea